The 1982 NSL Cup was the sixth season of the NSL Cup, which was the main national association football knockout cup competition in Australia. All 16 NSL teams from around Australia entered the competition.

Bracket

Round of 16

Quarter-finals

Semi-finals

Final

References

NSL Cup
1982 in Australian soccer
NSL Cup seasons